is the title of a Japanese series which focuses on a group of young girls who are striving to become famous Japanese idols.

The series first began as a set of light novels serialized in Enterbrain's Magi-Cu magazine. The franchise grew to include radio shows, drama CDs, a Japanese bishōjo game by PrincessSoft, and an anime television series which aired between October and December 2006.

Plot
The Lovely Idols are a group of young idol singers who have become very popular.  Managed by Tomohiro Fujisawa, there have already been two "generations" of performers, with a third about to debut. However, right before the third generation is cued onstage at a concert, Tomohiro learns that their debut has been delayed by the company president. He isn't told why, but is left to figure out for himself what, exactly, the next generation is lacking. While considering what he should do to remedy the situation, he finds a young street musician singing and playing a guitar. Tomohiro may think he's found the answer to his problem, but recruiting her could turn out to be harder than expected.

Characters
The voice actors listed are from the anime adaptation.

Third generation idols

Specialty: Singing
 
Mizuki is known as "The Princess of Songs" on the streets, as she often plays on the streets with her guitar. Many famous record companies have asked her to record for them but she turned them all down. When Tomohiro first asked her to become an idol, she strongly refused and said that she only sings for revenge. However, this all changed once when she first sings on stage with the other idols of the third generation, as seen in episode 3 of the anime. Ever since then, she officially became one of the idols in training with the third batch. Later on in the series, it is revealed that Mizuki's original intent of revenge stemmed from the fact that her mother Akina Sakaki abandoned her when she was just a child. Tomohiro encouraged Mizuki to confront Akina and rekindle their relationship, in which she did. Mizuki, like many of the Lovely Idols, seems to have feelings for Tomohiro, in which he reciprocates, though it is only canon in the ending theme PV.

Specialty: Stand up comedy
 
A shy girl, she and her best friend Mai are the only two in the third batch of Lovedols who had debut experience before. Kotoha is also partnered up with Mai for stand up comedy shows.

Specialty: Stand up comedy
 
Mai is a short and hot tempered girl. She often becomes the subject of jokes when compared to the breast sizes of the other members of the third generation. According to Mai, she was a child actor for 8 years before joining the third generation. She is also extremely proud of her own body; having gone as far as to wear a daring bikini made of shells to show off herself once, only to be forced to change back into a one piece swimsuit.

Specialty: Dancing
 
Miu often says "nyuu~" at the end of her sentences. Miu is fond of dancing and is very energetic. She has problems imitating the sound of dogs (A pun on her last name, which translates to 'cat valley'), always ending up sounding like a cat instead.

Specialty: Theater acting
 
Hina is the younger sister of the Chocorat Sisters from the first generation of idols. She often admires her older sisters with pride and joy. Whenever Hina brings up her sisters, she goes on and on about it until someone gets sick of it. Hina also likes to make pastries, but she is very bad at it; often resulting in explosions. Later on in the series, it is also revealed that she's bad at ovenware in general, as she made the microwave oven explode while reheating a bowl of miso soup.

Specialty: Voice acting
 
Ruri is Tomohiro's cheerful younger sister who personally asked the president of Sweetfish Productions to join the third batch of idols. She is a fan of the Magical Girl Sally series and has gotten a role in it. Ruri also cares a lot for Tomohiro to a point that he thinks she's kind of annoying.

Sweetfish Productions staff

Tomohiro works as one of the managers in Sweetfish Productions. He was the manager of all the Lovely Idols prior to the start of anime. Tomohiro is currently the manager of the 3rd Generation Lovely Idols. He is very popular with the Lovely Idols from the 1st and 2nd Generations, but is too dense to realize their growing feelings for him.

Mariko is the president of Sweetfish Productions, which is the company that all of the Lovely Idols are affiliated with. She demanded that the third batch are to delay their debut until Tomohiro could figure out what they were lacking. Mariko tends to have a serious, businesslike personality who only wants the best from her employees.

Miki is Ruri and Tomohiro's older sister, who is also a manager. Miki introduced her brother to Mariko, granting him his position as a manager. She is somewhat tomboyish, and tends to attack her brother in a playful way causing Tomohiro to fear her a little. Ruri doesn't seem to have a good relationship with her, as shown when she speaks rather coldly to her older sister, and also the fact that Ruri never calls Miki 'big sister'.

First generation idols
 Aya is a singer, and she has a crush on Tomohiro. The latter seems to reciprocate her feelings, as the two tried to share a kiss only to be interrupted by a phone call. Out of all of the Lovely Idols, Aya is the most forward girl in expressing her feelings.
 &  (Chocorat Sisters) China and Mina are twin singers. They both have feelings for Tomohiro. China seems to have minor tsundere attributes, whereas Mina is polite and a bit goofy.
 Yui is a voice actress who has a habit of holding onto cats.
 Ayumi is a model and a singer who often wears a kimono like outfit. She has feelings for Tomohiro, and is disappointed that he doesn't realize how she feels.
 Sayuki is a model. Like many of the Lovely Idols, she is in love with Tomohiro, and felt disappointed that he didn't compliment how cute she looked in a bikini.

Second generation idols
 Toko is a singer who fights to win Tomohiro's affection. She is forward as she clutches onto Tomohiro and makes affectionate comments such as, 'We look like a couple, don't we?'
 &  (Piccolo Sisters)
The Piccolo sisters have been known to be troublemakers.
This can be seen in episode 6 when they invade the apartment of the third batch. They used to live in the apartment the third generation lived in and they know all the secret routes within (as shown in the episode where a map with secret routes listed is shown). Hibiki and Shizuku both have feelings for Tomohiro, in which the former feels nervous around him and the latter constantly clinging onto Tomohiro with her legs and rubbing herself onto him.
 Yukimi is a voice actress who has a habit of holding onto a bunny doll. She has feelings for Tomohiro, and hides her face behind her bunny whenever she feels nervous around him.
 Makoto is an actress who specializes in action movies.
 Rei is a model.

Media
Lovely Idol was first created as a series of illustrated short stories, and later adapted into radio shows, drama CDs, a video game, and finally a televised anime series.

Illustrated short stories
Lovely Idol was first serialized in Enterbrain's Magical Cute Premium magazine, beginning with the inaugural spring 2001 issue (released April 27, 2001), featuring the story by Kohki Kanoh and character designs/illustrations by Aoi Nishimata. It followed the transition from the quarterly Premium to the monthly Magi-Cu magazine on February 27, 2004, where it ran until the 13th volume. Serialization resumed from the 26th issue (released April 25, 2006) to the 37th issue (released March 24, 2007) with the New Lyrics subtitle, and introduced the "third generation" cast of characters.  Story writing was credited to Agobaria, and copyright was shared by Enterbrain and Omegavision (parent company of Navel).

Radio shows
A 16-episode Lovely Idol radio show first premiered on Animate TV's Net Radio in 2003. In 2004, Lovely Idol became part of a Magicue show on Radio Kansai that was transitioned to Lantis Net Radio in 2005. A new radio show based on the anime cast began airing on Animate TV's Net Radio in 2006.

Drama CDs
Lantis published four Lovely Idol Drama CDs, beginning in 2003, featuring the first two generations of idols, and a drama CD featuring the third generation was released in 2007.  Another six-disc drama CD series was also released in 2007, with each disc telling the same story from the perspective of each of the third-generation characters.

Video game
The Lovely Idol visual novel video game was released on April 28, 2005 on the PlayStation 2 console, and was developed by video game company PrincessSoft.

The player takes the role of Tomohiro, managing the girls' schedules and helping them improve their skills. The player must also talk to the girls about their troubles and go on dates with them. The game could be considered a part of the "raising sim" subgenre of bishōjo games due to its focus on training the Lovedols.

Anime
An anime television series adaptation animated by AIC A.S.T.A and TNK first aired in Japan on October 3, 2006.  The TV broadcast consists of 12 episodes, where the 12th episode aired on 19 December 2006.  The 13th and final episode was made available as a DVD-exclusive OVA released in Japan on 28 March 2007.

Episodes

Music

External links

Princess Soft's official game website  

2001 Japanese novels
2005 video games
2006 anime television series debuts
2006 Japanese novels
2007 anime OVAs
Anime television series based on video games
Anime International Company
Bishōjo games
Famitsu Bunko
Japan-exclusive video games
Japanese idols in anime and manga
Lantis (company)
Kadokawa Dwango franchises
Light novels
Music in anime and manga
OVAs based on video games
PlayStation 2 games
TNK (company)
Video games developed in Japan
Visual novels
Windows games